The National Association of Educational Broadcasters (NAEB) was a US organization of broadcasters with aims to share or coordinate educational programmes. It was founded as the Association of college and University Broadcasting Stations (ACUBS) in 1925 as a result of Fourth National Radio Conference, held by the U.S. Department of Commerce.

It was primarily a "program idea exchange" with 25 members that occasionally attempted to rebroadcast programs shared between them. The original constitution for the organization read:

"Believing that radio is in its very nature one of the most important factors in our national and international welfare, we, the representatives of the institutions of higher learning, engaged in educational broadcasting, do associate ourselves together to promote, by mutual cooperation and united effort, the dissemination of knowledge to the end that both the technical and educational feature of broadcasting may be extended to all."

ACUBS held its first annual conference July 1 and 2 1930 in Columbus, Ohio joining with the Institution of Education by Radio.

In September 1934, the organization rewrote its constitution, and changed its name from the Association of College University Broadcasting Stations (ACUBS) to the "National Association of Educational Broadcasters."

In 1938, NAEB persuaded the Federal Communications Commission to reserve five radio channels for educational broadcasting.

In 1945 the FCC reserved five of the 40 channels in new high-frequency band for Non-commercial educational stations. There were initially planned to be AM services; however, they eventually manifested as FM ones.

NAEB merged with the Association of Education by Radio-Television in 1956. It was reorganized in 1963 with two new divisions, Educational Television Stations and National Educational Radio. These divisions lasted until 1973, when they were diminished. Their roles were taken over by Public Broadcasting Service (PBS) and Association of Public Radio Stations (APRS) respectively. The APRS became the "Washington lobby and public relations arm of CPB-qualified radio stations." The APRS merged with National Public Radio (NPR) in 1977, which allowed NPR to provide "leadership of a full-fledged membership organization providing member stations with training, program promotion and management, and representing the interests of public radio stations before Congress, the FCC and other regulatory organizations." Before this merger, NPR was "largely a production and distribution center," so the merger was influential in making NPR what it is today.

Until it folded in 1981, NAEB was public broadcasting's primary voice, forum and program distributor.

See also
 American Archive of Public Broadcasting
 National Educational Radio Network
 National Public Radio
 Chalmers Marquis, a former Vice President of the NAEB and broadcasting advocate
 Burton Paulu, a former President of the NAEB and manager of radio station KUOM

References

Further reading
 
 A History of Public Broadcasting: Witherspoon, Kovitz, Avery, Stavitsky. 2000, Current Publishing Committee, Washington, DC. .
 Robert M. Reed papers, at the University of Maryland libraries. Reed served on the TV Planning and TV Advisory Committees. The papers contain information on the Association from 1954 to 1978. For more information about various NAEB employees please visit the University of Maryland Archives.

External links 

 National Association of Educational Broadcasters (NAEB) audio tapes as well as the papers of Executive director Robert A. Mott, and researcher and member Warren F. Seibert can be found at the University of Maryland Libraries.
 Public Radio's First Program Distribution Network Born at WNYC

Public broadcasting in the United States
1925 establishments in the United States
1981 disestablishments in the United States
Radio organizations in the United States
Television organizations in the United States
Educational broadcasting